Ian Cameron Esslemont (born 1962) is a Canadian writer. He was trained and has worked as an archaeologist. He is best known for his series Novels of the Malazan Empire, which is set in the same world as the Malazan Book of the Fallen epic fantasy series written by his friend and collaborator, Steven Erikson. Esslemont is the co-creator of the Malazan world.

Biography
Ian Cameron Esslemont was born in Winnipeg, Manitoba, Canada. He has lived and worked in Southeast Asia, including four years spent in Thailand and Japan. He is currently working on a new trilogy set in the Malaz world. He lives in Alaska with his wife, novelist Gerri Brightwell, and their three sons.

Works

Esslemont and Erikson co-created the Malazan world in 1982 as a backdrop for role-playing games. In 1991 they collaborated on a feature film script set in the same world, entitled Gardens of the Moon. When the script did not sell, Erikson greatly expanded the story and turned it into a novel. The two writers agreed to both write books set in the same world. However, it took a further eight years before Gardens of the Moon was published by Bantam UK and Erikson agreed to write a further nine novels set in the same world. Life and work commitments delayed Esslemont's own entries to the series until 2004, when his first novel, Night of Knives, was published as a limited edition by PS Publishing (a mass-market release by Bantam UK followed in 2007). This book was a prequel to the main Malazan sequence. His second novel, Return of the Crimson Guard, takes place within the main Malazan sequence, shortly after the events of the sixth book, The Bonehunters. It was published by PS Publishing in May 2008 and by Bantam UK later that year. Both Night of Knives and Return of the Crimson Guard have now been bought by Tor for publication in the United States.  His third novel, Stonewielder, was published by Bantam UK in 2010 and Tor in the US.  His fourth novel, Orb Sceptre Throne was published in 2012. In spring 2014 he signed a contract with Bantam for three more novels set in the Malazan world.

Books

Novels of the Malazan Empire
Six-part novel series set in the world of Malazan. The novels cover events simultaneous with Erikson's the Book of the Fallen, of the Crimson Guard, the succession of the Malazan Empire, the situation on Korel and Jacuruku and the mystery of Assail. Some of these events are hinted at during the course of the Malazan Book of the Fallen. Characters that appear throughout the novels are Kyle, Greymane and the avowed members of the Crimson Guard like Shimmer, Blues, K'azz, Skinner and Cowl.

Path to Ascendancy 
The Path to Ascendancy is a prequel series set in the world of Malazan, written by Ian Cameron Esslemont. The stories deal with the early adventures of Dancer and Kellanved (Dorin and Wu, in this series) and their eventual rise to power on Quon Tali.

Footnotes

External links

Ian C. Esslemont's official website
Interview with Jay Tomio, May 2008
Interview at SFFWorld.com
Interview at Clarkesworld Magazine, August 2009
Interview, April 2016

1962 births
Writers from Winnipeg
Malazan Book of the Fallen
Novels of the Malazan Empire
Canadian fantasy writers
Canadian male novelists
Living people